The following lists events that happened during 1949 in the Grand Duchy of Luxembourg.

Incumbents

Events
 4 April – Luxembourg signs the North Atlantic Treaty, becoming a founder member of NATO.

Births
 23 April – Lydie Err, politician
 27 April – Jean Asselborn, politician
 12 May – Robert Mehlen, politician
 10 July – René Kollwelter, politician
 1 October – Yves Mersch, banker
 21 November – Alain Meyer, President of the Council of State

Deaths
 13 March – Auguste Liesch, politician

Footnotes

References